Lutselk'e Airport  is located  northeast of Lutselk'e Northwest Territories, Canada. Caribou may be found on the runway and the local terrain makes this a difficult aerodrome to use at night.

Airlines and destinations

See also
Lutselk'e Water Aerodrome

References

External links

Certified airports in the North Slave Region